Thomas Thornton Reilley (March 20, 1883 – January 27, 1940) was an American college football coach and politician. He served the 12th head football coach at New York University (NYU). He held that position for two seasons, 1914 and 1915, leading the NYU Violets to a record of 9–7–2. Having come off a scoreless, losing season in 1913 under Jake High, NYU's record under Reilley in 1914 of 5–3–1 showed a marked improvement. However, Reilleys' tenure at NYU ended in 1915 with a 70–0 loss to Rutgers.

Reilley was a Democratic member of the New York State Assembly (New York Co., 21st D.) in 1916.

Head coaching record

References

1883 births
1940 deaths
20th-century American politicians
Democratic Party members of the New York State Assembly
NYU Violets football coaches
Sportspeople from Manhattan
Politicians from New York City
Coaches of American football from New York (state)